The  is a tilting limited express electric multiple unit (EMU) train operated by Shikoku Railway Company (JR Shikoku) in Shikoku, Japan, since 1992.

Operations
 Ishizuchi
 Shiokaze

Formations
As of 1 October 2013, 48 vehicles were in service, formed as 3- and 5-car sets, as shown below.

3-car sets

Prototype set S1

Cars 6 and 8 are each fitted with one S-PS59 lozenge-type pantograph. The pantograph on car 8 was removed in 2010. This set were retired from service by March 2018.

Set S2-S6

Cars 6 and 8 are each fitted with one S-PS59 lozenge-type pantograph. The pantograph on car 8 was removed between 2010 and 2011. Car 7 is removed from formations during off-peak seasons between 2011 and 2018.

5-car sets L1–L6

 Half of car 8 includes Green car (first class) seating. Cars 1 and 3 are each fitted with one S-PS59 lozenge-type pantograph.

History

The prototype set, S1, was delivered in May 1992, and entered revenue service on 19 September 1992.

The subsequent fleet of full-production sets entered service from 18 March 1993.

The entire fleet underwent life-extension refurbishment between 2004 and 2006.

Livery variations

References

External links

 JR Shikoku information 

Electric multiple units of Japan
Shikoku Railway Company
Train-related introductions in 1992
Hitachi multiple units
Tilting trains
Nippon Sharyo multiple units
1500 V DC multiple units of Japan